St. Joseph Mercy Hospital is a Catholic hospital. It is Located on Parade Street, Kingston in Georgetown, Guyana. It was established by the members of the Sword of the Spirit movement and was officially opened in 1945. The hospital includes a School of Nursing. The oldest wing of the hospital burnt down on Monday, May 10, 2010, at 7 am. In 2020, the hospital opened a specialized COVID-19 treatment ward.

References

External links 
 http://mercyhospital.gy/

Hospital buildings completed in 1945
Hospitals in Guyana
Christianity in Georgetown, Guyana
Hospitals established in 1945
Catholic Church in Guyana
Catholic hospitals in South America
Buildings and structures in Georgetown, Guyana